Aleksandar Radović may refer to:

 Aleksandar Radović (footballer), Montenegrin football player
 Aleksandar Radović (water polo), Montenegrin water polo player